Yarlequé is a surname derived from  which means scoffer in the Tallán Quechuan language.

References

Quechuan-language surnames